Splish Splash may refer to

 "Splish Splash" (song)
 Splish Splash (amusement park)